Lanuéjols is the name of two communes in France:

 Lanuéjols, in the Gard department
 Lanuéjols, in the Lozère department